Andreas Aguilar (born 26 January 1962) is a German former gymnast who competed in the 1988 Summer Olympics.

References

1962 births
Living people
German male artistic gymnasts
Olympic gymnasts of West Germany
Gymnasts at the 1988 Summer Olympics